Turbatrix is a genus of nematodes belonging to the family Panagrolaimidae.

The species of this genus are found in Europe.

Species:

Turbatrix aceti 
Turbatrix dryophilus

References

Nematodes